St. Michael's Church is a property in Grand Forks, North Dakota that was listed on the National Register of Historic Places in 1988.

It was built during 1908–1909, and includes Romanesque architecture.

It was designed by the Hancock Bros. and built by E.C. Richmond.

References

External links
St. Michael's Church - official site

Roman Catholic churches completed in 1909
20th-century Roman Catholic church buildings in the United States
Churches on the National Register of Historic Places in North Dakota
Churches in the Roman Catholic Diocese of Fargo
Tourist attractions in Grand Forks, North Dakota
National Register of Historic Places in Grand Forks, North Dakota
Romanesque Revival architecture in North Dakota
1909 establishments in North Dakota